Kahler is a German surname. Notable people with the surname include: 

Art Kahler (1897–1982), American football and basketball player and coach
Bob Kahler (1917–2013), American football player and coach
Carl Kahler (1856–1906), Austrian painter
Erich Kahler (1885–1970), Czech-American literary scholar and essayist
Ferdinand N. Kahler (1864–1927), American inventor, entrepreneur and automobile pioneer
George Kahler (1889–1924), American baseball player
Hans-Joachim Kahler (1908–2000), German general
Kris Kahler (born 1983), Australian rugby player
Lyndsay Kahler (born 1974), American beauty pageant winner
Otto Kahler (1849–1893), Austrian physician
Royal Kahler (1918–2005), American football player
Taibi Kahler (born 1943), American psychologist
Wolf Kahler (born 1940), German actor

See also
Kähler (disambiguation)

German-language surnames
Surnames from nicknames